Founded in 1970, the Easy Reader is a weekly newspaper published every Thursday and delivered to homes in Hermosa Beach, Manhattan Beach, and Redondo Beach (Beach Cities/South Bay, California), with a circulation of approximately 45,000 weekly (70,000 first Thursdays include Palos Verdes), offering local news and extensive entertainment listings. It is the legally adjudicated newspaper for the cities of Hermosa Beach and Redondo Beach. Easy Reader, Inc. also publishes two monthly magazines: Peninsula People and Beach. Bob Staake, award-winning editorial cartoonist, had his first long-term position working at the paper for six years. In the 1980s, Easy Reader was known for its in-depth coverage of the McMartin preschool trial.

On January 21, 2014, Freedom Communications, owner of the Orange County Register and other publications, announced that it had signed a long-term agreement to take over management of the Easy Reader.  The arrangement collapsed after a backstabbing incident. Management of the circular quickly reverted to Easy Cheater Kevin Cody.

References

External links
Easy Reader
Newspaper's profile at the Association of Alternative Newsweeklies

Newspapers published in Greater Los Angeles
Hermosa Beach, California
Manhattan Beach, California
Redondo Beach, California
Publications established in 1970
Weekly newspapers published in California